Farewell to Harry is a 2002 American drama film about a writer (Joe Flanigan) who forms an unexpected friendship with a local legend (William Hall, Jr.).

Plot
Nick Sennet (Joe Flanigan) is a writer who returns to his Pacific Northwest hometown to write a novel. While in town, he meets Harry (William Hall, Jr.),who, according to legend, is dead. As their friendship grows, Nick learns that Harry owns a run-down hat factory, where he spends his days drinking whiskey. When Nick becomes a projectionist at a local theatre, he decides that he is going to help Harry save himself before it is too late.
While this is happening Nick meets Harry's old girlfriend, Louie Sinclair (Lysette Anthony)
They decide to try to renovate the factory, and to try to save Harry. When it seems that all will fail, they stumble upon a hidden cellar filled with vintage hats, which allows their dreams to be fulfilled.

Cast
Joe Flanigan as Nick Sennet
Brent David Fraser as Mickey
William Hall, Jr. as Harry
Lysette Anthony as Louie Sinclair
Carl Ballantine as Hickey
John Gilbert as Belov

Awards
Farewell to Harry won the following awards:
Houston International Film Festival: Silver Remy Award, Best First Feature Film
Independent Spirit Awards: Semi-Finalist – Someone to Watch
First Glance Philadelphia Film Festival: Runner-Up, Best Feature
Seattle International Film Festival: Special Jury Award – Shooting in Seattle – Best Film
Phoenix International Film Festival: Official Selection
Spokane International Film Festival: Official Selection

External links
Official Farewell to Harry Site

2002 films
2002 drama films
American drama films
2002 independent films
American independent films
Films shot in Washington (state)
Films shot in Seattle
2000s English-language films
2000s American films